Alexandris is a Greek surname. The female form of the surname is Alexandri. Notable people with the surname include:

Alexis Alexandris (born 1968), Greek footballer and manager
Efstathios Alexandris (1921–2013), Greek politician and lawyer
Vangelis Alexandris (born 1951), Greek basketball player and coach

See also
Alexandri (disambiguation)

Greek-language surnames